"Electricity" is a song by Captain Beefheart and his Magic Band on the 1967 album Safe as Milk. Beefheart claimed the label he and his band were signed to, A&M Records, dropped them after co-owner Jerry Moss heard the song and declared it "too negative" for his teenage daughter to listen to. Beefheart's vocals, while recording the final version for the album, shattered the microphone.

Critical reception
 
Critics have said the song foreshadows many of Beefheart's later efforts with its praised distorted vocals. Guitarist Doug Moon described the song as "hinting of things to come."  Critics also described the theremin in the song as a "ghostly theremin in the most disconcerting way." In the book Riot on Sunset Strip: Rock 'n' Roll's Last Stand in Hollywood, "Electricity" is said to be "a very unconventional blues song".

History
While playing "Electricity" in a warm-up performance for the Monterey Pop Festival at the Fantasy Fair and Magic Mountain Music Festival at Mount Tamalpais in 1967, Beefheart stopped the song, straightened his tie, and walked off the stage, landing face flat into the grass. He later claimed that he saw a girl in the audience turn into a goldfish. This caused guitarist Ry Cooder to immediately quit the Magic Band because he couldn't deal with Beefheart's unpredictability. Cooder's departure brought about the cancellation of the  scheduled appearance at the Monterey Pop Festival, thereby frustrating Beefheart's chances of any future  commercial success.

Covers
On the deluxe version of Sonic Youth's Daydream Nation, released in 2007, the bonus disc closes with their cover of the song, originally recorded in 1988 for a Captain Beefheart tribute album released on Imaginary Records entitled Fast 'n' Bulbous – A Tribute to Captain Beefheart.

American Noise Rock/Post-Hardcore band Racebannon cover the song on one of their 2002 albums, In the Grips of the Light.

References

Sources
 
 
 
 
 
 
 

Captain Beefheart songs
Songs written by Captain Beefheart
Blues rock songs
Sonic Youth songs
1967 singles
1978 singles
1967 songs